Native American studies (also known as American Indian, Indigenous American, Aboriginal, Native, or First Nations studies) is an interdisciplinary academic field that examines the history, culture, politics, issues, spirituality, sociology and contemporary experience of Native peoples in North America, or, taking a hemispheric approach, the Americas. Increasingly, debate has focused on the differences rather than the similarities between other Ethnic studies disciplines such as African American studies, Asian American Studies, and Latino/a Studies.

In particular, the political sovereignty of many indigenous nations marks substantive differences in historical experience from that of other racial and ethnic groups in the United States and Canada. Drawing from numerous disciplines such as anthropology, sociology, history, literature, political science, and gender studies, Native American studies scholars consider a variety of perspectives and employ diverse analytical and methodological tools in their work.

Two key concepts shape Native American studies, according to Crow Creek Lakota scholar Elizabeth Cook-Lynn, indigenousness (as defined in culture, geography, and philosophy) and sovereignty (as legally and historically defined). Practitioners advocate for decolonization of indigenous peoples, political autonomy, and the establishment of a discipline dedicated to alleviating contemporary problems facing indigenous peoples.

History
The Native American historical experience is marked by forcible and sometimes cooperative attempts at assimilation into mainstream European-American culture (Americanization). Beginning with missionaries and leading up to federally controlled schools, the aim was to educate American Indians so that they could return to their communities and facilitate cultural assimilation. As described by David Beck in his article "American Indian Higher Education before 1974: From Colonization to Self-Determination", the schools were a tool for assimilation. Their focus was not academic, but training for industrial or domestic jobs.

The Civil Rights Movement of the 1950s-1960s contested mainstream methods of assimilationist indoctrination and the curriculum in K-12 schools and universities throughout the United States. American Indian students, coupled with sympathetic professors, assisted in creating programs with new goals. Rather than being focused on education for community assimilation there was a move to educate for empowerment. Programs that practiced community outreach and focused on student retention on campus arose from that movement. The school programs fostered a new interpretation of American Indian history, sociology, and politics.

During the First Convocation of American Indian Scholars in March 1970 at Princeton University, indigenous scholars drafted a plan to develop "Native American Studies as an Academic Disclipine", which would defend indigenous control of land and indigenous rights and would ultimately reform US Indian Policy. This discipline would be informed by traditional knowledge, especially oral history, and would "defend indigenous nationhood in America".

In contrast to Western anthropology, the knowledge base of Native American studies is endogenous, emerging from indigenous communities. Developers of Native American studies widely dismissed scientific objectivity, since Western cultural biases have historically informed anthropology and other disciplines.

Decolonizing Native American Studies

Linda Tuhiwai Smith is a Professor of Education and Maori Development and Pro-Vice-Chancellor Maori at the University of Waikato in Hamilton, New Zealand. Smith explains that the word "research" is linked to European colonialism. Indigenous peoples are apprehensive and cautious of that connection, and the pursuit of knowledge, or research, is deeply embedded in multiple layers of European and Colonial processes. Colonial definitions and understandings of native peoples were reported to the West and then those representations were sent back and attached to indigenous identity. In this way, research is very powerful. Indigenous researchers must be afforded the opportunity to critique and fine tune the methodologies so that   their experiences are more accurately represented.

Periodization

Philip Deloria, professor of Native American History at Harvard University, a popularly accepted authority in the field, explores the historiography of Native American history by focusing in on important questions. Deloria acknowledges the abundance of work in the canon, but also understands the lack of diversity among its authors. Through his examination of the system or organization and possible future inclusions and multiplicities of the field, Deloria leads the reader to the question of epistemology. He highlights the idea of difference insisting that historians must analyze how non-native writers have viewed the Native Americans as different and how Natives have viewed those assessments. Another focus of Deloria’s, is on periodization. He provides four broad historical periods in written Native American History. In analyzing the work from Frontiers History, Racial Science, Modernist History and Native Narrative, shifts in historical writing can be identified. He states that, "each suggests changes in social, political, and epistemological positions within non-Indian societies that have helped to produce new kinds of history writing." All of Deloria’s research brings him to the conclusion that the most interesting new work in the field of Native American History can come from both Native and Non-Native writers, who have fully explored the work of the other side.

Academic journals
 American Indian Quarterly
 American Indian Culture and Research Journal
 Canadian Journal of Native Studies
 European Review of Native American Studies
 Native Studies Review
 Studies in American Indian Literatures (SAIL)
 Transmotion
 Wíčazo Ša Review

Conferences
Native American Literature Symposium

Notable scholars

Taiaiake Alfred (Kanien’kehaka/Kahnawake Mohawk)
Paula Gunn Allen (Laguna Pueblo/Sioux)
Greg Cajete (Santa Clara Pueblo)
Dean Chavers (Lumbee)
Brenda Child (Red Lake Ojibwe)
Allison Hedge Coke
Elizabeth Cook-Lynn (Crow Creek Sioux)
Philip S. Deloria (Standing Rock Sioux)
Vine Deloria, Jr. (Standing Rock Sioux)
Raymond DeMallie
Jack D. Forbes (self-identified Powhatan/Renape-Lenape descent)
Daniel Heath Justice (Cherokee Nation)
Trudie Lamb-Richmond (Schaghticoke)
Stacy Leeds (Cherokee Nation)
Devon A. Mihesuah (Choctaw Nation)
Lorin Morgan-Richards
Jean O'Brien (White Earth Ojibwe)
Simon J. Ortiz (Acoma Pueblo)
Luana Ross (Salish and Kootenai)
Greg Sarris (Federated Indians of Graton Rancheria)
Audra Simpson (Mohawk)
James Thomas Stevens (Mohawk)
Charlene Teters (Spokane Tribe)
Gerald Vizenor (White Earth Anishinaabe)
Robert A. Williams Jr. (Lumbee)
Craig Womack (self-identified Muscogee descent)
Alfred Young Man (Rocky Boy Chippewa-Cree)

See also

Center for World Indigenous Studies
Cultural studies
Diné College Press
Indian Country Today
Indigenous Law Centre
Postcolonialism

Publications
AlterNative: An International Journal of Indigenous Peoples
First American Art Magazine
Journal of Aboriginal Health
Journal of Indigenous Studies
Tribal College Journal

Notes

References

Further reading

External links
Native American and Indigenous Studies Association
Native American Art Studies Association
Guide to Native American Studies Programs in the United States and Canada
Native Studies Review

 
Native American topics
American studies
Postmodernism